Axia napoleona is a species of moth of the family Cimeliidae first described by Schawerda in 1926. It is found on Corsica.

The larvae feed on Euphorbia insularis.

References

Moths described in 1926
Cimeliidae
Moths of Europe